The Georgia State University Law Review is a law review edited and published by students at Georgia State University College of Law.  In addition to scholarly articles, each fall the Law Review publishes a detailed legislative review of the activities of the Georgia General Assembly known as the Peach Sheets.  The Peach Sheets serve as the state's only legislative history.

Rankings 
In 2013, ExpressO ranked the Law Review 83rd among the 100 Most Popular General Student Law Reviews, based upon submissions.  In 2014, ExpressO's ranking for the Law Review increased to 47th, and then in 2015 the ranking increased again to 33rd.

The Membership Selection Process 
Two factors go into the determining which students receive invitations to join the Law Review.  First, the journal considers the academic rank of the students.  The full-time rising 2L class and part-time rising 3L class are ranked together in the summer after completing the first year full time curriculum.  Second, students may choose to participate in the summer writing competition held by the Law Review.

The top 10 students in academic class rank receive an automatic invitation to join Law Review.   Next, the top 10 written submissions receive an invitation.   Finally, a composite score weighing the class rank and written submission equally is generated and the top 10-20 scores receive an invitation.

External links
Georgia State University Law Review

References 

American law journals
Quarterly journals
Law journals edited by students
Publications established in 1984
General law journals
Georgia State University